Possessed is a 2019 South Korean television series starring Song Sae-byeok, Go Joon-hee, Yeon Jung-hoon and Jo Han-sun. It aired on OCN's Wednesdays and Thursdays at 23:00 KST time slot from March 6 to April 25, 2019.

Synopsis
Detective Kang Pil-sung and psychic medium Hong Seo-jung join forces to get rid of the ghost of a murderer who was executed 20 years ago.

Cast

Main
 Song Sae-byeok as Kang Pil-sung
A police detective who was abandoned by his family and is trying to unlock the secrets of his newly found powers of seeing ghosts.
 Go Joon-hee as Hong Seo-jung
A woman who can see ghosts, read people's minds, and control people, plus has some knowledge about spirits. She has never met her mother, having been abandoned by her at a young age.
 Yeon Jung-hoon as Oh Soo-hyeok
The new body that Hwang Dae-du possesses. He is a wealthy businessman and is the CEO of TF Group. When possessed, he could control a drug that can turn people into a zombie-like creature.
 Jo Han-sun as Seon Yang-woo
A follower of the serial killer Hwang Dae-du who briefly inhibits his spirit. He is a surgeon at Hanul Medical Center. He is killed after he is shot multiple times by policemen.

Supporting

Twenty years ago
 Jang Hyuk-jin as Kim Nak-chun
A former police officer and veteran detective who lost his partner and is killed by Seon Yang-woo. He arrested Hwang Dae-du. He wages constant battle with Hwang Dae-du and will do anything to stop him from getting power.
 Seo Eun-woo as Kim Ji-hang
 Detective Kim Nak-chun's daughter
 Won Hyun-joon as Hwang Dae-du
A serial killer responsible for 30 murders over 5 years. He is a spirit, having been executed 20 years ago, but seeks to gain power to restore his body.

At Sangdong Police Station
 Lee Won-jong as Detective Squad Chief Yoo
The chief of police who acts as a Guardian to Kang Pil-sung. He is a tough but soft officer who tries to help his comrades. He is killed when he is shot but goes into Pil-sung to instruct him what to do.
 Park Jin-woo as Choi Nam-hyun
A police officer who is Kim Joon-hyung's boss. He gets discouraged easily.
 Kwon Hyuk-hyun as Kim Joon-hyung
A new recruit who is Choi Nam-hyun's partner. The youngest detective. 
 Ahn Eun-jin as Choi Yeon-hee
A cute and lovable traffic cop who retains her youthful appearance.
 Jeong Chan-bi as Yoo Seung-hee 
Detective Yoo's daughter.

People around Seo-jung
 Gil Hae-yeon as Geum-jo 
Seo-jung's mother, she is a worshipper who was killed by Seon Yang-woo. Her spirit is then killed by Hwang Dae-du. She had the power of summoning spirits but unlike her daughter, she can cast spells.
 Jo Won-ki as Bae Do-ryeong
A playful shaman who enjoys dating pretty women who comes to fortune telling.
 Lee Ji-hae as Cho Seung-kyung
Seo-jung's landlord and sports dance instructor. In love with Bae Do-ryeong.

People around Soo-hyeok
 Park Sang-min as Jang Choon-sub
Gangster boss who takes care of Oh Soo-hyeok's work and takes advantage of other people. Soo-hyeok's assistant who becomes the new Hwang Dae-du when his spirit enters his body. He was responsible for killing Pil-sung's mother and his assistant.

Others
 Jeong Hae-na as Sohee
Seo-jung's best friend and owner of a clothing store.
 Kim Yeon-jin
 Woo Seon-yool
 Lee Jung-min
 Park Soo-yeon
 Gi Se-hyeong as Chun-seop's subordinate
 Oh Yu-jin as Mi-seon
Female employee at Hanul Medical Center.
 Ryu Hye-rin as Hye-rin
 Kwak Myung-hwa
 Oh Jae-kyun
 Shin Woo-hee
 Lee Sang-in
 Lee Chae-bin
 Gong Jeong-hwan
 Kwon Yong-sik
 Jang Myung-woon
 Baek Jae-woo
 Park Sung-yeon as Ji-sook
 Cho Wan-gi

Cameos
 Jung Han-yong as the director of Hanul Medical Center
 Jang Hyun-sung as the doctor who treats Detective Chief Squad Yoo
 Park Soon-chun as the director nun
 Lee Young-ah as Stephanie

Original soundtrack

Part 1

Part 2

Part 3

Part 4

Part 5

Part 6

Part 7

Part 8

Part 9

Ratings
In this table,  represent the lowest ratings and  represent the highest ratings.

References

External links
  
 
 

OCN television dramas
2019 South Korean television series debuts
2019 South Korean television series endings
South Korean thriller television series
South Korean comedy television series
Television series by Studio Dragon
Korean-language Netflix exclusive international distribution programming